Streltsi is a village in Southern Bulgaria. It's located in municipality Brezovo, Plovdiv Province. Until the year 1934 the village bore the name Kadurshikli or Kadurshik. As of 2020, the village has a population of 389 people.

Geography 
The village is located 39 kilometers away from the center of Plovdiv and lies on an altitude of 250 meters above sea level. The air in the village is saturated with negatively charged electrons, making the air insusceptible to fog and air pollution. For this reason, in 1969 a children's hospital for treatment of pulmonary diseases and asthma was founded. In 2006 the hospital was closed due to financial issues.

There is an oak tree with an age of over 400 years near the village, which was announced as a protected specimen in February 2009. The oak is located on the coast of Suho dere river. It is tall, around 25 meters and has a circumference of more than 4 meters.

There are large carps and crucian fish in the rivers near the village.

Infrastructure 
During 2019, in Streltsi village, the inhabitants complain that there is an issue with the drinking water. There have been complaints that mud was coming out of the tap along with the water, polluting it, rendering it undrinkable. The problem was resolved.

There are two working enterprises in the village, grocery stores and cafeterias. There is also a functioning school.

Notable people 

 Aleksander Todorov Koev - Province governor of Plovdiv (1922 - 1923).
 Ivan Hristov Valev - Bulgarian poet
 Georgi Michev - Bulgarian actor
 Petar Koev - deputy in the National Assembly of Bulgaria.

References 

Villages in Plovdiv Province